Air Chief Marshal Sir John Gingell,  (3 February 1925 – 10 December 2009) was a senior Royal Air Force commander.

Military career
The son of Ernest (1895–1981) and Hilda (née Attwood; 1894–1957) Gingell, he was educated at St Boniface's Catholic College, Plymouth. He was commissioned into the Royal Air Force Volunteer Reserve in April 1945. A few months later he transferred into the Royal Navy Volunteer Reserve, serving in the Fleet Air Arm. In 1951 he returned to the Royal Air Force was posted to flying duties on No. 58 Squadron.

In 1963 he was appointed Officer Commanding No. 27 Squadron flying Vulcan B2s equipped with Blue Steel missiles and in 1966 he became Deputy Director of the Defence Operations Staff at the Ministry of Defence. He went on to be Military Assistant to Chairman of the Military Committee at NATO Headquarters in 1968, Air Officer Administration at Headquarters RAF Germany in 1970 and Air Officer Commanding No. 23 Group in 1973. After that he became Assistant Chief of the Defence Staff (Policy) in 1975, Air Member for Personnel in 1978 and Air Officer Commanding-in-Chief at Support Command in 1980. His last appointment was as Deputy Commander-in-Chief Allied Forces Central Europe in 1981 before he retired in 1984.

In retirement Gingell served as Gentleman Usher of the Black Rod in the Houses of Parliament until 1992.

Family
In 1949 he married Prudence Johnson; the couple had two sons and a daughter, John, Nicholas and Alexandra.

References

|-
 

|-

|-

|-

1925 births
2009 deaths
Knights Grand Cross of the Order of the British Empire
Knights Commander of the Order of the Bath
Knights Commander of the Royal Victorian Order
Fleet Air Arm aviators
Royal Air Force air marshals
People educated at St Boniface's Catholic College
Place of birth missing
British Roman Catholics
Royal Air Force Volunteer Reserve personnel of World War II
Fleet Air Arm personnel of World War II
Royal Naval Volunteer Reserve personnel of World War II
Ushers of the Black Rod